Simone Ghini, also known as Simone Ghini I and as Simone I di Giovanni di Simone Ghini, was an Italian Renaissance sculptor from Florence who was born in 1406 or 1407.  He is best known for his funeral monument to Pope Martin V, in the Basilica of St. John Lateran, in Rome.  Together with Antonio Filarete, Simone also made a set of bronze doors for St. Peter's Basilica in Rome.  
Giorgio Vasari in his Lives of the Most Excellent Painters, Sculptors, and Architects erroneously stated that Simone was the brother of Donatello.  Simone Ghini died in 1491.

See also
Renaissance art

Bibliography
 Thieme, Ulrich and Felix Becker, editors, Allgemeines Lexikon der bildenden Künstler von der Antike bis zur Gegenwart. Reprint of 1907 edition, Leipzig, Veb E.A. Seemann Verlag, 1980–1986.
 Vasari, Giorgio, Le Vite delle più eccellenti pittori, scultori, ed architettori, many editions and translations.

References 

1400s births
1491 deaths
15th-century Italian sculptors
Sculptors from Florence
Italian male sculptors
Italian Renaissance sculptors
Year of birth missing
Catholic sculptors